Pavel Pavlov Strakhilov (born 9 June 1953 in Kostinbrod) is a former Bulgarian Greco-Roman wrestler who competed in the middleweight (82 kg) category.

His international career lasted from 1976 to 1981. He was third at the Grand Prix of Germany competition in 1976 and went on to finish fifth in his class in 1977 World Wrestling Championships. On his second world-level appearance at the 1979 edition in San Diego, he managed to win the bronze medal. He had the same placing at the German Grand Prix the following year.

His greatest achievement was winning the 82 kg Greco-Roman bronze medal for Bulgaria at the 1980 Moscow Olympics, as he reached the final round but was defeated by both Jan Dołgowicz and Gennadi Korban. He won two more medals of that colour for his country at the 1980 and 1981 European Wrestling Championships.

References

External links
Athlete Database. Foeldeak. Retrieved on 2011-06-24.

1953 births
Living people
People from Kostinbrod
Olympic wrestlers of Bulgaria
Wrestlers at the 1980 Summer Olympics
Bulgarian male sport wrestlers
Olympic bronze medalists for Bulgaria
Olympic medalists in wrestling
World Wrestling Championships medalists
Medalists at the 1980 Summer Olympics
Sportspeople from Sofia Province